Acleris platynotana is a species of moth of the family Tortricidae. It is found in China, Japan (Hokkaido, Honshu) and the Russian Far East. The habitat consists of rhododendron groves and black birch-oak-pine forests.

Adults have been recorded on wing from May to June and again from August to October in Japan.

The larvae feed on Ilex pedunculosa, Lyonia ovalifolia, Rhododendron kaempferi, Rhododendron molle and Quercus glauca. They feed within the rolled leaves of their host plant. Larvae can be found in June. The species overwinters as an adult.

References

Moths described in 1900
platynotana
Moths of Asia